Lightning rod fashion was a fad in late eighteenth-century Europe after the lightning rod, invented by Benjamin Franklin, was introduced. Lightning rod hats for ladies and lightning umbrellas for gentlemen were most popular in France, especially in Paris. The concept that inspired the fashion was that a lightning bolt would strike the Franklin-designed protective device instead of the person, and then the electricity would travel down a small metal chain into the ground harmlessly. The technology was already used to some extent in France to protect wooden buildings, and was therefore an accepted science concept that developed into a temporary fashion.

Background 

The lightning rod, invented by Franklin in the mid-eighteenth century to protect wooden structures, did not become commonplace in the United States until the nineteenth century, over fifty years after he first unveiled the concept. However, his experiments made electricity a fashionable topic in European society.

Fashion styles 

In 1778, experiments were performed testing the concept of placing a lightning rod above a person's head, in an accessory, to protect him or her from lightning strikes. A woven metal ribbon was placed around a lady's hat, and a small chain made of silver was attached to the ribbon. The chain was meant to run down the back of the lady's dress and drag on the ground. The electricity of a lightning strike to the ribbon would theoretically travel down the chain and into the ground, thus protecting the wearer of the hat. The supposed protection that this type of hat offered made it a popular Paris fashion trend in 1778. The lightning hat was called le chapeau paratonnerre in French.

A gentleman's 1778 version of the lightning hat involved an umbrella with a tip extended into a pointed rod. A metal chain ran from the rod over the exterior of the open umbrella and down onto the ground, thus providing a conduit for the lightning to follow. In French, the lightning umbrella was called le parapluie-paratonnerre.

This was intended for use by people in open areas, such as a farmers in their fields.

In the humorous play Le Palais de Cristal ou les Parisiens à Londres (The Crystal Palace or the Parisians in London), written on the occasion of the Great Exhibition 1851 by Clairville and Éléonore Tenaille de Vaulabelle (under the pseudonym Jules Cordier), there is a scene presenting a version of the lightning hat (chapeau paratonnerre) as a "Chinese invention".

References

Sources 

Protective gear
Science in popular culture
18th-century fashion